Mael Mórdha are an Irish doom metal band from Dublin, Ireland. Its name can also be written in traditional Irish typography, as Mael Mórḋa. The band's music melds doom metal with Irish folk music to create what has been referred to as "Gaelic doom metal".

History
Mael Mórdha was formed in January 1998 by Roibéard Ó Bogail (formerly the vocalist of the band Dreamsfear). On the strength of the band’s last two EPs, Caoineadh na nGael and Cluain Tarbh, the band was signed to Dutch label Karmageddon Media which released the band’s first album, Cluain Tarbh on 12 September 2005. An alternative recording of the album title track was released on a limited edition 7 inch vinyl split with their fellow Irishmen Primordial, through Sentinel Records in the winter of 2005.

Due to severe internal problems within Karmageddon and a lack of availability of the album, the band left the label and signed to Grau Records in Germany in February 2006. Gealtacht Mael Mórdha is the band's first album to be released through Grau Records, on 19 March 2007. In 2008, their debut album was re-released by Grau Records with two additional tracks previously recorded on the band's first EP, The Path to Insanity.

The band has played the Abbeyleix Metalfest (Ireland - 1999), Day Of Darkness (Ireland - 2003, 2004, 2007), Bloodstock Open Air (England - 2006, 2013), Heathen Crusade II (Saint Paul, Minnesota, United States- 2007), Doom Shall Rise, (Göppingen, Germany - 2007) and Dutch Doom Days (Rotterdam, The Netherlands - 2007).

The band entered the Irish leg of the Eurovision Song Contest 2005 in late 2004, with the aim of entering the finals held in Kyiv, Ukraine in 2005.

Mael Mórdha's third album, entitled Manannán, was released on 14 May 2010, by Grau Records.

Between November 2011 and January 2012 Mael Mórdha recorded their fourth album at Foel Studio in Wales, with producer Chris Fielding. Entitled Damned When Dead, the album was released by Candlelight Records in September 2013. In January 2014, Roibéard Ó Bogail left the band. He was replaced by Celtachor vocalist/whistle player Stíofán De Roiste in October of that year.

Members

Current
 Stíofán De Roiste - Vocals, Whistle 
 Gerry Clince - guitars
 Dave Murphy - bass
 Shane Cahill - drums

Discography

Albums

EPs/Splits

Notes

External links
Mael Mórdha at MySpace
Mael Mórdha's on YouTube
Mael Mórdha at Grau Records

Celtic metal musical groups
Irish doom metal musical groups
Musical groups established in 1998
Musical quintets
Irish folk metal musical groups